Divinity Road is a residential road in Oxford, England. It connects with the east end of Morrell Avenue to the northeast and with Cowley Road to the southwest. The road is on a hill sloping southwest.

The road includes detached, semi-detached, and terraced houses. 
Divinity Road Area Residents’ Association (DRARA) is a residents' association in the local area around Divinity Road.
The Beeches, student accommodation of Linacre College, Oxford, is located in Divinity Road.

Lily van den Broecke, a gold medalist in the mixed coxed fours event on Dorney Lake at the 2012 Summer Paralympic Games, was a resident of the road in 2012, so a post box in the road was painted gold in her honour.
Divinity Road features in the book The Rocktastic Corduroy Peach by Michael Amos.

Gallery

See also
 2012 Summer Olympics and Paralympics gold post boxes

References

Streets in Oxford
Linacre College, Oxford